In Canadian politics, the "summer barbecue and kissing babies circuit" or simply, the barbecue circuit refers to the summer activities of Canadian legislators and politicians during breaks from parliament and the provincial legislatures.  This involves attending  many community events in order to meet constituents.  The term refers to the ubiquity of grilled meat (barbecue) at such gatherings.

Federal Liberal leader Michael Ignatieff was criticized by his own party for taking the 2009 barbecue season off.

In 2011, interim federal Liberal leader Bob Rae visited "P.E.I. for a strawberry social... the Assembly of First Nations gathering in New Brunswick and then the Calgary Stampede."

The 2012 barbecue circuit began in late June with events related to St. Jean Baptiste Day/Fête Nationale events in Quebec.  In 2012, federal Opposition Leader Thomas Mulcair visited the Calgary Stampede and was voted the best dressed politician by The Globe and Mail.  Also at the 2012 Calgary Stampede, Alberta's rival conservative leaders, Alberta PC Premier Alison Redford, and Wildrose Opposition Leader both attended Prime Minister Harper's barbue party, as did other Canadian conservative legislators included federal and provincial cabinet ministers.

References 

Political terminology in Canada
Barbecue
Summer traditions
Canadian traditions